The Women's 500m Time Trial is one of the 7 women's events at the 2007 UCI Track Cycling World Championships, held in Palma de Mallorca, Spain.

21 Cyclists from 15 countries participated in the contest. The Final was held on March 31, at 17:15.

World record

Final

References

Women's 500 m time trial
UCI Track Cycling World Championships – Women's 500 m time trial
UCI